Willard Morgan  is an American performance artist and filmmaker, also founder and artistic director of the East Village art collective Ideal Glass.  Son of opera singer Sylvia Side, he graduated from William Esper Studio and New York University.

Performer 
Starting his career in the 80's downtown scene, Morgan performed at Comic Strip as a standup comedian (with  emcee Jerry Seinfeld).  Strongly influenced by Jacques Lecoq, he acted off-Broadway under the direction of Austin Pendleton at Playwrights Horizons.  Over the years, he has created evolving theater personas, appearing solo at B.B. King, the Highline Ballroom, the Japan Society (Manhattan), and La Scala Nightclub in Paris.  He is the frontman and lyricist of the collaborative project Ideal Orkestra, described as a 'kinetic international band with a highly theatrical bent'.

Producer 
As the founder of Ideal Glass, Morgan produces in-your-face music videos about trends, fashion and gentrification (Sweatshop Boogie, Days of a Dandy, Silks & Satins). He is also prolific as a film producer with feature credits and award-winning shorts. Theatrical productions include Say Goodnight, Gracie by Ralph Pape which ran two years Off-Broadway, and the Broadway play by Milan Stitt which became Stanley Kramer's last feature film, The Runner Stumbles.

Work 
Stage
Sweatshop Boogie (2013–present, live performances for fashion week)
Ideal Orkestra (2012–present, music collaboration)
Jelvis (2006, the Jewish Elvis - international tour)
Saint Hollywood (2005, Edinburgh Festival Fringe)

Film
Dawn of the Beast (2021)
Me & Michael (2006, documentary feature featuring Michael Moore) - director and producer
Fever Pitch (2001, short film) winner: Sony Vision Comedy Award at American Film Institute, and Best Short Film at the Central Florida and Ft Lauderdale International Film Festivals - filmmaker
America So Beautiful (2001, 35mm feature) - co-producer
Jimmy's Reality (1993, shortest film at the Sundance festival that year, physical bit was copied by Mr. Bean) - talent

Exhibit
Un-Finished Cuba (2015, photo and video installation)
 Photo group shows: Bedlam Gallery, M.J. Higgins Gallery, Bedlam Warehouse Gallery Downtown (2004-2005)

References

External links
 
 
 Music videos
 Ideal Orkestra band

Living people
American performance artists
American multimedia artists
East Village, Manhattan
Jewish male comedians
American stand-up comedians
Year of birth missing (living people)